The 2005 Lamar Hunt U.S. Open Cup ran from June through September, 2005, open to all soccer teams in the United States.

The Los Angeles Galaxy won their second Open Cup championship with a 1–0 victory over FC Dallas at the Home Depot Center in Carson, California.

Although two Major League Soccer sides played in the final, the tournament featured several runs by underdogs. The Des Moines Menace of the Premier Development League beat two USL First Division teams to reach the Fourth Round. The Minnesota Thunder of the USL First Division beat three MLS teams in succession to reach the semifinals. The Rochester Raging Rhinos continued to play to record crowds and beat the MetroStars before losing in a shootout to the Chicago Fire. Four of the tournament's final 15 games went to overtime.

Open Cup Bracket
Home teams listed on top of bracket

Schedule
Note: Scorelines use the standard U.S. convention of placing the home team on the right-hand side of box scores.

Qualifying round
Teams from USASA and PDL start.

First round
Teams from USASA, PDL, and USL-2.

Second round
Four USL-1 and four USL-2 teams enter.

Third round
Four USL-1 and four MLS teams enter.

Fourth round

Quarterfinals

Semifinals

Final

Top scorers

See also
 United States Soccer Federation
 Lamar Hunt U.S. Open Cup
 Major League Soccer
 United Soccer Leagues
 USASA
 National Premier Soccer League

2005 in American soccer
2005
2005 domestic association football cups